Pavlos Katharios (born 11 March 1992) is a Greek professional footballer who plays as a midfielder for Greek club Iraklis.

References

External links
 

1992 births
Living people
Footballers from Thessaloniki
Greek footballers
Association football midfielders
Agrotikos Asteras F.C. players
Xanthi F.C. players
Pierikos F.C. players
Apollon Pontou FC players
Panachaiki F.C. players
Kavala F.C. players
Super League Greece players
Football League (Greece) players